A paranormal event is one that allegedly defies scientific explanation.

Paranormal may also refer to:

 Paranormal?, British television documentary series
 Paranormal (Prozak album), second studio album by US rapper Prozak; released in 2012
 Paranormal (Alice Cooper album), 27th studio album by rock musician Alice Cooper; released in 2017
Paranormal (TV series), an Egyptian TV series; released on Netflix in 2020

See also
 ParaNorman, a 2012 film